Courtney Pine,  (born 18 March 1964), is a British jazz musician, who was the principal founder in the 1980s of the black British band the Jazz Warriors. Although known primarily for his saxophone playing, Pine is a multi-instrumentalist, also playing the flute, clarinet, bass clarinet and keyboards. On his 2011 album, Europa, he plays almost exclusively bass clarinet.

Background
Pine's parents were Jamaican immigrants, his father a carpenter and his mother a housing manager.  As a child, he wanted to be an astronaut. Born in London, Pine lived in the ‘Avenues’ area of Kensal Green in north-west London, before moving to Wembley and attending Kingsbury High School, where he studied classical clarinet, teaching himself the saxophone from the age of 14. He began his music career playing reggae, touring in 1981 with Clint Eastwood & General Saint.

Career
In 1986 Pine's debut album Journey to the Urge Within entered the UK Top 40. One of his early bands was Grand Union Orchestra and he featured on their 1986 album The Song of Many Tongues, written by Tony Haynes. He is the principal founder of the seminal black British big band the Jazz Warriors, which he established in 1985 through the community organisation "The Abibi Jazz Arts" (TAJA).  The Jazz Warriors developed out of the Abibi All-Stars community band that did a series of performances at London's Royal Festival Hall foyer during the summer of the International Youth Year 1985.  The Jazz Warriors recorded two albums under Pine's leadership: Out of Many, One People, which was released on the Antilles division of the Island Records label in 1987, and Afropeans, which was released on Pine's own label, Destin-e Records, for their 20th anniversary in 2007.  The Jazz Warriors Afropeans project was commissioned by the Arts Council of England to commemorate the bicentennary of the Abolition of the Slave Trade Act.  Thirty years after Pine planted his idea to start the Jazz Warriors, he put together the "Venus Warriors" all-female jazz band for a charity performance to raise awareness of the Mary Seacole Memorial Statue Appeal, which was established to erect a statue of the British-Jamaican Crimean War business woman and nurse outside of London's St Thomas's Hospital.

His recent music integrates modern British music like drum and bass and UK garage with contemporary jazz styles. He runs his own band and integrates many contemporary musicians in his performances. He also presents Jazz Crusade on BBC Radio 2, the seventh series of which was broadcast during spring 2007.

In 1988 he appeared as himself in a jazz quartet in the Doctor Who serial Silver Nemesis.

After losing his record contract, in 1989 Pine appeared on stage with the Pet Shop Boys at Wembley Arena. He played saxophone on the closing portion of their single, Nothing Has Been Proved. 

Pine was appointed Officer of the Order of the British Empire (OBE) in 2000, and Commander of the Order of the British Empire (CBE) in the 2009 New Year Honours for services to jazz music. He was also awarded an honorary doctorate from the University of Westminster on 6 December 2004. He was awarded an honorary doctorate from the University of Southampton on 15 July 2010.

Pine appeared in August 2008 as an advocate for Pierre Boulez, on the BBC World News classical music programme Visionaries.

On Christmas Day 2018 Pine appeared on BBC Two's Merry Christmas Baby - with Gregory Porter & Friends.

Personal life
Pine lives in London with his wife and their four children.

Discography

Albums
As leader
 Journey to the Urge Within (1986) – UK No. 39
 Destiny's Song + The Image of Pursuance (1988) – UK No. 54
 The Vision's Tale (1989)
 Closer To Home (1990)
 Within The Realms of Our Dreams (1991)
 To The Eyes of Creation (1992)
 Modern Day Jazz Stories (1995)
 Underground (1997)
 Back in the Day (2000)
 Devotion (2003)
 Resistance (2005)
 Transition in Tradition: En Hommage a Sidney Bechet (2009)
 Europa (2011)
 House of Legends (2012)
 Song (The Ballad Book) (2015)
 Black Notes From The Deep (2017)

As sideman
Mica Paris, So Good (1988)
Trevor Jones, Angel Heart (Soundtrack) (1987)
Jazz Warriors, Out of Many, One People (1987), Afropeans (2008)
Harry Beckett, Les Jardins Du Casino (1993, ITM)

Singles
 "Children of the Ghetto" (1986) (Courtney Pine featuring the vocal of Susaye Greene)
 "Like Dreamers Do" (1988) – UK No. 26 (Mica Paris featuring Courtney Pine)
 "I'm Still Waiting" (1990) – UK No. 66 (Courtney Pine featuring Carroll Thompson)
 "Get Busy" (1992), produced by Gussie Clarke – 12" vinyl, CD single 
 "Too Much To Lose" (1999) – Elkie Brooks, featuring Courtney Pine
 "Lady Day (& John Coltrane)" (2000) – Courtney Pine featuring Lynden David Hall

EPs
 Traditions Beckoning – 10" limited edition (1988)

See also
Jazz Warriors

References

External links
 – official site

1964 births
Living people
Jazz fusion musicians
English jazz saxophonists
British male saxophonists
English bass clarinetists
Commanders of the Order of the British Empire
Black British musicians
English people of Jamaican descent
Musicians from London
21st-century saxophonists
21st-century clarinetists
21st-century British male musicians
British male jazz musicians
Jazz Warriors members